Vegetative Sculpture I is a public art work by artist Bernhard Heiliger located at the Lynden Sculpture Garden near Milwaukee, Wisconsin. The sculpture has an abstract form; it is installed on the patio.

See also
 Unfolding

References

1959 establishments in Wisconsin
1959 sculptures
Abstract sculptures in Wisconsin
Bronze sculptures in Wisconsin
Fiberglass sculptures in the United States
Outdoor sculptures in Milwaukee